Thomas Archdeacon was an English politician who was MP for an unidentified constituency. He was the father of John Archdeacon, and the grandfather of Michael Archdeacon and Warin Archdeacon.

References

14th-century English MPs
14th-century English politicians